Mark Blackett (born 3 February 1964) is a former English cricketer. Blackett was a right-handed batsman. He was born at Edmonton, Middlesex.

Having previously played second eleven cricket for Middlesex without breaking into the starting eleven, Blackett later made his first-class debut for Leicestershire against Nottinghamshire at Trent Bridge in the 1985 County Championship, with him making a second first-class appearance in that season's County Championship against Worcestershire at Grace Road. He scored 41 runs in these two matches, with a high score of 28 not out. He made his debut in List A cricket in that same season against Glamorgan in the John Player Special League. He made five further List A appearances for the county, the last of which came against Somerset in the 1986 John Player Special League. In his six matches in that format, he scored 53 runs with a high score of 21 not out.

References

External links
Mark Blackett at ESPNcricinfo
Mark Blackett at CricketArchive

1964 births
Living people
People from Edmonton, London
English cricketers
Leicestershire cricketers
English cricket coaches